Pinta (also known as azul, carate, empeines, lota, mal del pinto, and tina) is a human skin disease caused by infection with the spirochete Treponema carateum, which is morphologically and serologically indistinguishable from the bacterium that causes syphilis. The disease is endemic to Mexico, Central America, and South America.

Signs and symptoms
Pinta, the least severe  of treponemal infections  being limited to the skin, is thought to be transmitted by skin-to-skin contact (similar to bejel and yaws), and after an incubation period of two to three weeks, produces a raised papule, which enlarges and becomes hyperkeratotic (scaly/flaky). Lesions are usually present in the exposed surface of arms and legs. Local lymph nodes might be  enlarged. Three to nine months later, further thickened and flat lesions (pintids) appear all over the body. These generally resolve, but a proportion of people with pinta will go on to develop late-stage disease, characterised by widespread pigmentary change with a mixture of hyperpigmentation and depigmentation that can be disfiguring.

Cause
Pinta is caused by the bacterium Treponema carateum. It is related to the more well-known T. pallidum, which can cause endemic syphilis.

Diagnosis
Diagnosis is usually clinical, but as with yaws and bejel, serological tests for syphilis, such as rapid plasma reagin (RPR) and TPHA, will be positive, and the spirochetes can be seen on dark field microscopy of samples taken from the early papules.

Treatment
The disease can be treated with penicillin, tetracycline (not to be used in  pregnant women), azithromycin or chloramphenicol, and can be prevented through contact tracing by public health officials. A single intramuscular injection of long-acting penicillin  is effective against endemic treponematoses including  pinta, yaws, and bejel.

See also

 List of cutaneous conditions

References

External links 

Bacterium-related cutaneous conditions
Syphilis
Tropical diseases